Hyacinth Gabriel Connon, F.S.C. (July 11, 1911 – August 24, 1978), was a Lasallian Brother and President of De La Salle University in Manila from 1950 to 1959 and 1966 to 1978, the second president to have served two terms in the history of the university, the first being Brother Acisclus Michael, F.S.C. He had the longest time to exert his influence on the university, initially for nine years, subsequently for twelve for a total of twenty-one years.

The greatest achievement ever made during Connon's administration was the granting of the charter as a university to the college on February 19, 1975.

First term
Connon's first term was marked by the expansion of the college and its professionalization, began under Brother Chrysostom Peter Clifford, F.S.C., who assumed the post of Dean of the College, succeeding Brother Lambert Edward Chisholm FSC, its post-war re-founder. It was also during this first period of the presidency that Brother Gabriel assumed the Directorship of the Community, the Presidency of the College, and the Auxiliary Visitorship of the Philippines in 1953, the Philippines having been raised to be a sub-district of the San Francisco Province of the Brothers.

As Auxiliary Visitor, Brother Gabriel, using De La Salle as a base and as the mother institution, opened the novitiate in Baguio in 1951, the scholasticate on Taft Avenue in 1960, and the junior novitiate (also on Taft Avenue) in 1959.

In addition, Connon opened La Salle College Bacolod, La Salle Greenhills, La Salle Iligan, and La Salle Lipa. Within De La Salle College, the growing autonomy of the college as a separate unit was symbolized by the construction of Saint Joseph Hall.

Second term

It was during Connon's second term that the position of Director (Superior) of the Brothers' Community was separated from the Presidency of the college. Brother Gabriel as President oversaw the expansion of the college from an enrollment of 1,500 to more than 5,000 and the expansion of its units. Benilde Hall (now St. Brother Miguel Hall) was constructed and the plans for the student Services Building (named Connon Hall in his memory) was finalized. It was also during his second term that De La Salle College was granted university status. By that time he had an investiture celebration as De La Salle's first Filipino President, having been granted Philippine citizenship by an Act of Congress on August 10, 1970.

Other achievements 

In the 1950s, Brother Gabriel was involved in the establishment of the Catholic Educational Association of the Philippines, and became its President in 1952.  He resigned the post in 1957 for health reasons.

In the 1960s, Brother Gabriel, in tandem with the rector of the Ateneo de Manila University at that time, worked for the founding of the Asian Institute of Management, a graduate school of business for Southeast Asia.

Honorary degrees 

 Doctor of Letters (1950)—St. Mary’s College: Moraga, California
 Doctor of Philosophy (1961)—Ateneo de Manila University: Quezon City, the Philippines
 Doctor of Philosophy (1961)—San Beda College: Manila, the Philippines

References

DLSU System: Past Presidents: Hyacinth Gabriel FSC system.dlsu.edu.ph Accessed, March 2006 

1911 births
1978 deaths
Ateneo de Manila University alumni
People from Chicago
Roman Catholic religious brothers
American Roman Catholic missionaries
American emigrants to the Philippines
Filipino educators
Filipino Roman Catholics
Presidents of De La Salle University
De La Salle Brothers in the Philippines
Naturalized citizens of the Philippines
Asian Institute of Management people
Presidents of universities and colleges in the Philippines
Roman Catholic missionaries in the Philippines
Catholics from Illinois